Bath broom (or)) is a besom, or broom, used for bathing in saunas, such as Russian banyas.

See also

 Birching
 Venik

References

Further reading
Всё О Бане. Banya Reference Guide

Bathing
Finnish culture
Russian culture